Bournemouth West railway station was a railway station in Bournemouth, Dorset, England.

History
The station opened on  15 June 1874. Although passenger trains were withdrawn from 6 September 1965  a substitute bus service was provided until official closure on 4 October 1965. The closure was originally temporary, but then became permanent and the station was demolished.  The station was the southern terminus of the Somerset and Dorset Joint Railway, as well as being the terminus for trains from London Waterloo and other local trains.

Accidents and incidents
On 17 August 1956 a rake of carriages ran away colliding with another rake of carriages and a parcels van. The van was pushed into the parcels office bringing down its roof crushing two cars.

Closure

The station was closed during the electrification of the London Waterloo to Bournemouth line. Originally the closure was meant to be temporary pending completion of the electrification project, as it was thought that Bournemouth Central did not have enough capacity to handle all of Bournemouth's trains.  Experience during the temporary closure showed that the newly electrified Central station could handle all the trains in the town, so the closure became permanent.

The station was demolished shortly after the closure became permanent and the site is now occupied by a car park and the A338 Wessex Way.  Bournemouth Train Care depot, former home of the Class 442 Wessex Electrics, occupies the former approaches to the station.

References

External sources
 Bournemouth West
 SEMG online
 The station on navigable 1946 O. S. map

Disused railway stations in Bournemouth
Former London and South Western Railway stations
Railway stations in Great Britain opened in 1874
Railway stations in Great Britain closed in 1965